("invitation", also spelt dâvah, daawa, dawah, daawah or dakwah) is the act of inviting or calling people to embrace Islam. The plural is daʿwāt (دَعْوات) or daʿawāt (دَعَوات).

For certain groups within Islam like the Salafis and Jamaat-e-Islami, daʿwah is also considered as a political activity. For these groups, the aim of daʿwah outreach is also to engineer a reversal of what they perceive as the decline of Islam in the modern era, through the systematic propagation of Islamist ideology and ultimately enable the establishment of an Islamic state.

Etymology 
Daʿwah  literally means "issuing a summons" or "making an invitation". Grammatically, the word represents a gerund of a verb with the triconsonantal root d-ʕ-w meaning variously "to summon" or "to invite".

A dāʿī, is a person who invites people to understand and accept Islam through dialogue and other techniques, may be regarded as a missionary inviting people to the faith, prayer and manner of Islamic life.

Early Islam 

The term daʿwah has other senses in the Qur'an. In sura (chapter) 30:25, for example, it denotes the call to the dead to rise on the Day of Judgment. When used in the Qur'an, it generally refers to Allah's invitation to live according to his will. Thus, when used in the first centuries of Islam, it usually referred to that message and was sometimes used interchangeably with sharī‘a and dīn.

Daʿwah is also described as the duty to "actively encourage fellow Muslims in the pursuance of greater piety in all aspects of their lives", a definition which has become central to contemporary Islamic thought.

During Muhammad's era

During the Expedition of Al Raji in 625, Muhammad sent some men as missionaries to various different tribes. Some men came to Muhammad and requested that Muhammad send instructors to teach them Islam, but the men were bribed by the two tribes of Khuzaymah, who wanted revenge for the assassination of Khalid bin Sufyan (Chief of the Banu Lahyan tribe) by Muhammad's followers. A number of missionaries were killed in this expedition, either eight or, according to another account, ten.

Then during the Expedition of Bir Maona in July 625 Muhammad sent some missionaries at the request of some men from the Banu Amir tribe, but the Muslims were again killed in revenge for the assassination of Khalid bin Sufyan by Muhammad's followers. 70 Muslims were killed during this expedition.

During the Expedition of Khalid ibn al-Walid (Banu Jadhimah) in January 630, Muhammad sent Khalid ibn Walid to invite the Banu Jadhimah tribe to Islam. This is mentioned in the Sunni Hadith .

Mus'ab ibn 'Umair was the first Muslim envoy in September 621. He was sent to Yathrib (now Medina) to teach the people the doctrines of Islam and give them guidance.

Post-Muhammad
After Muhammad's death in 632, from the available historical evidence, it appears that after Muhammad's death Muslims did not immediately embark upon daʿwah activities—during and after the rapid conquests of the Byzantine and Persian lands, they ventured little if at all to preach to local non-Muslims. Daʿwah came into wider usage almost a hundred years after Muhammad's death, in the wake of 'Abbasid propaganda against the then ruling Umayyad clan in the 720s. However, the 'Abbasid daʿwah ceased as soon as the 'Abbasids were in power—a fact that attests to its political nature. Daʿwah as a truly missionary activity, albeit still within the Muslim Umma, appeared in the form of the Isma'ili daʿwah of the 9th through 13th centuries. Isma'ilis, in many ways, can be seen as the pioneers of the organized Muslim missionary activities: their highly institutionalized and sophisticated daʿwah structure has hardly been repeated until today. Moreover, for the Isma'ilis, daʿwah was a state priority. The Isma'ili daʿwah encompassed extra- and intra-ummatic forms and blended both theology and politics.

Purpose 

In Islamic theology, the purpose of daʿwah is to invite people, Muslims and non-Muslims, to understand the worship of God as expressed in the Qur'an and the sunnah of Muhammad and to inform them about Muhammad.

Daʿwah as the "Call towards God" is the means by which Muhammad began spreading the message of the Qur'an to mankind. After Muhammad, his followers and the Ummah (Muslim community) assumed responsibility for it. They convey the message of the Qur'an by providing information on why and how the Qur'an preaches monotheism. Muhammad saw Islam as the true religion and mission of all earlier prophets.  He believed that their call had been limited to their own people but that his was universal. His mission as the final prophet was to repeat to the whole world this call and invitation (daʿwah) to Islam.  Muhammad wrote to various non-Muslim rulers, inviting them to convert.

Scriptural basis 

The importance of daʿwah has been emphasised many times in the Quran:

In the Hadith ("sayings") of Muhammad, daʿwah is mentioned to emphasise importance and virtues:

 "Whoever directs someone to do good will gain the same reward as the one who does good."
 "Whoever calls to guidance will receive the same reward as the one who follows him without any decrease in the reward of his follower."
 "For Allah to guide someone by your hand is better for you than having red camels."(In ancient Arabia, camelsespecially of a reddish huewere considered particularly valuable property.)
 "Convey from me, even if it be only a single verse."

Muhammad sent Muadh ibn Jabal to Yemen and told him “You will be going to Christians and Jews, so the first thing you should invite them to is the assertion of the oneness of Allah, Most High. If they realize that, then inform them that Allah has made five daily prayers obligatory on them. If they pray them, then inform them that Allah has made the payment of charity from their wealth obligatory on their rich to be given to their poor. If they accept that, then take it from them and avoid the best part of people's property.”

Methods

Gentleness
With regard to Muhammad's mild nature in preaching Islam, the Quran says:
And by the mercy of Allah you dealt with them gently. If you were harsh and hardhearted, they would have fled from around you..

The Quran says about Moses and Aaron who preached to Pharaoh, the claimant of God:
So speak to him, both of you, mildly in order that he may reflect or fear God..

Muhammad was reported by his wife, Aisha to have said “Whenever gentleness is in a thing, it beautifies it, and whenever it is withdrawn from something, it defaces.”

Muhammad was quoted by Jareer as saying,“One deprived of gentleness is deprived of all good."

Influence in politics
Muslims made it a part of their political theory (through relating daʿwah to jihad) and life (using the concept of daʿwah in their political agendas). Taken in general, the intertwining of daʿwah and politics, then, has been a feature throughout the Muslim history, though practical implications of this have been different in different ages.

Wisdom
"Invite to the way of your Lord with wisdom and good instruction, and argue with them in a way that is best. Indeed, your Lord is most knowing of who has strayed from His way, and He is most knowing of who is [rightly] guided ..."..

A classical example of diversion in daʿwah can be seen in the case of Yusuf in prison when two prisoners asked him to interpret their dreams. One of them said: “I saw myself pressing wine.” The other said: “I saw myself carrying bread on my head and birds were eating from it.” They asked: “Inform us of the interpretation of these things. Indeed, we believe you are one of the righteous.” He replied: “Whenever food came to you as your provision, I informed you about it before it came. That is from what my Lord has taught me.... As for one of you, he will pour wine for his lord to drink, and as for the other, he will be crucified and birds will eat from his head. This is the case judged concerning which you both inquire.”

Speaking a common language
“I did not send any messenger except that he spoke the language of his people to explain to them.”

Location
Doing daʿwah in the right location. For example, Mount Safa in the time of Muhammad was used for announcements. So Muhammad went there to make his point. He chose that particular location because he knew the people who he was inviting to Islam. He knew their nature and characteristics, so he chose Mount Safa. He climbed up to its summit and addressed his people saying: “O people of Quraysh, if I were to tell you there was an army behind this hill would you listen to me?”

Daʿwah training
Various Islamic institutions provide elaborate manuals, trainings and workshops to daʿi to prepare them for successful daʿwah.

Daʿwah manual
Daʿwah manuals, booklets or guides are training material that give a framework and methodology for a daʿi to invite non-Muslims to accept and convert to Islam. The manuals present detailed guidance on how to carry out dialogue, various techniques and detailed steps of implementing daʿwah for non-muslim individual or collective audiences as well as socio-religious groups like atheists, Buddhists, Christians, Hindus etc.

Trainings and workshops
Daʿis are given trainings in the form of physical workshops and training sessions. Daʿwah trainings are also provided in the form of online video lessons, webinars, online discussion forums, handouts and quizzes.

Movements 

Modern daʿwah movements are varied in their objectives and activities. Examples include:
 The Muslim Brotherhood has focused on a methodology of building grassroots institutions and funding welfare projects, which has helped it survive decades of repression under hostile governments in many Middle Eastern countries, with the group and its many offshoots still enjoying popular support and power.
 Jamaat-e-Islami has focused on presenting Islam as a complete way of life and on the methodology of building grassroots institutions and funding welfare projects.
 Tablighi Jamaat works on trying to bring the Muslims back to the fundamental practices of Islam such as worship; they do this by encouraging members to speak and to teach them the virtues of good actions. The movement has a following of between 20 and 80 million people and, though it originated in India, now has a global following.
 Ahmed Deedat was a notable debater who was a revolutionary figure among Muslims for his effort in debating Christian polemics. Many Muslim debaters from popular debaters to grassroots daʿwah campaigners use his books and videos as reference material.
 Zakir Naik was a student of Ahmed Deedat and followed in his teacher's footsteps by debating Christian polemics and by holding Q&A sessions with Christians. Zakir Naik is particularly notable for taking the effort of debating Christian polemics to the Muslim mainstream with his popular channel Peace TV.
 iERA is a research institute based in London which seeks to debate Muslim and non-Muslim intellectuals, help new Muslims, train speakers and produce academic research papers on daʿwah issues. iERA was founded by Abdurraheem Green (Anthony Green) and Yusuf Chambers, British converts to Islam. It developed the GORAP method for daʿwah: God’s Oneness, Revelation and Prophethood. GORAP is a framework for holding daʿwah conversations and conveying the message of Islam in stages.
 Hikmah Times of Singapore there is a significant impact of the Islamic daʿwah movement. There are many local/international organisations (e.g. Hikmah Times).
 The Murabitun World Movement is a movement in Spain that advocates pledging allegiance to an emir and the revival of the Islamic gold dinar as currency for zakat.
 Discover Islam Centre established in Cape Town, South Africa, 2005 by Dr Abdullah Hakim Quick from Canada. Conveying the message of Islam to people of all walks of life. Building bridges in communities through knowledge, breaking down misconceptions about Islam. Offering classes to Non Muslims and New Muslims to learn more about the fundamentals of  Islam.
 Uplift Dawah is a Dawah non-profit based in Seattle, Washington with chapters in Seattle and Africa.
Northwest Dawah Foundation is a daʿwah non-profit based in Portland, Oregon with activities in Southwest Washington and Oregon.
 Al Furqaaan Foundation is a daʿwah non-profit based in Chicago which focuses on distributing Qur'an through partner daʿwah organizations across the United States.
 Youth Club a non-profit, non-sectarian, non-political organization, which provides a unique platform for the youth and provides them avenues to channel their potential in accordance with Islamic values. Since its inception in 2011, Youth Club is working to create well-balanced individuals, who are not only skilled in their respective fields but also recognize and fulfil their religious obligations and participate actively in their communities.
 The Latino American Dawah Organization is a grassroots organization founded in 1997 to propagate Islam within the Hispanic American community. LADO frequently makes references to the history of Islamic Spain in their works.

Methods may also depend upon specific creeds. For instance, among Ismailis, al-Naysaburi's Code of Conduct depicts the values in which dais should spread the word of Islam to Muslims and non-Muslims. Idris Imad al-Din's work presents us with an indigenous account of the traditions of the daʿwa in Yaman. His account of the Nizari–Musta'li succession dispute reflects the official view of the Tayyibis. Similarly, modern-day platforms designated for open-air public speaking in the western world also provide platforms for debate between different denominations in Islam, with documented instances of dialogue being reported between demographics such as Quranists and Mahdi'ist based creeds such as Mahdavia.

See also 

 Spread of Islam
 Islamic missionary activity
 Jizyah

Footnotes

References 
 Encyclopaedia of Islam, Leiden, Netherlands: Brill, 
 Hirschkind, Charles (2004). "Civic Virtue and Religious Reason: An Islamic Counter-Public" in Drobnick, Jim Aural Cultures. .
 The Multiple Nature of the Islamic Da'wa , Egdūnas Račius, Academic Dissertation, October 2004. University of Helsinki, Faculty of Arts, Institute of Asian and African Studies.
 Klemm, Verena, and Walker, Paul E. 2011. Code of Conduct: A Treatise on Etiquette of the Fatimid Ismaili Mission. I.B. Tauris.
  Saqr, Abdul B. How to Call People to Islam, Trans. Shakil Ahmed. Riyahd: WAMY.
 Sookhdeo Patrick, and Murray, Douglas. 2014. Dawa: The Islamic Strategy for Reshaping the Modern World. Isaac Publishing.

External links 
 The Tools of the Daa’ie
 Dawah Resoucre Hub

Islamic terminology
Conversion to Islam
Religious occupations
Practical theology